"Stand Up" is a song recorded by American country music artist Mel McDaniel. It was released in September 1985 as the lead single and title track from McDaniel's album Stand Up.  It peaked at number 5 on the U.S. Billboard Hot Country Singles & Tracks chart and at number 3 on the Canadian RPM Country Tracks chart. It was written by Bruce Channel, Ricky Ray Rector, and Sonny Throckmorton.

It was covered by The Band on their 1996 album High on the Hog.

Music video
The music video was directed by George Bloom and premiered in mid-1985. The video features actor Gailard Sartain portraying a defendant in a divorce court scenario of which he calls upon McDaniel as a key eyewitness testimony in an attempt to be exonerated from his case.

Chart performance

References

1985 singles
Mel McDaniel songs
Songs written by Sonny Throckmorton
Capitol Records Nashville singles
Song recordings produced by Jerry Kennedy
Songs written by Bruce Channel
1985 songs